Robert Wallace Taylor (August 12, 1901 – December 12, 1993) was an American professional ice hockey right winger who played eight games for the Boston Bruins of the National Hockey League in 1930, scoring no points and receiving six penalty minutes.

Taylor played pro hockey between the 1926 and 1936 seasons, almost all of it in the Canadian–American Hockey League, principally for the Boston Tigers and the Providence Reds.

Career statistics

Regular season and playoffs

External links
 

1901 births
1993 deaths
American men's ice hockey right wingers
Boston Bruins players
Boston Cubs players
Boston Tigers (CAHL) players
Brown Bears men's ice hockey coaches
Ice hockey players from Massachusetts
Providence Reds players
Sportspeople from Brookline, Massachusetts